Panayiotis Varotsos (born November 28, 1947 in Patras) is a Greek physicist and former professor in the Department of Physics of the University of Athens, notable for his VAN method to predict earthquakes.

His group claims the ability to identify electromagnetic signals that are precursors to earthquakes.  They suggest the precursors are generated by electricity from piezo-stimulated effects in rocks being stressed just prior to the earthquake rupture. Onassis Foundation Laureate for the Environment (1995). Also awarded by the Academy of Athens (1978) and Empeirikion Foundation (1986). In 2016 the Union of Greek Physicists honoured him for his work with a prize delivered by the President of Greece.

Works

References

Further reading
 Physics Web, Maxwell Equations and Earthquakes, News from VAN Research Group, May 2004 (in Greek). Retrieved on 07-08-2016 from Physics4u.
 New Scientist Environment, Heartbeats warn of sudden death risk, March 31, 2004. Retrieved on 07-08-2016 from New Scientist.
 S.N. Kodellas, Research University Institutes, July 1, 2005 (in Greek). 2007-06-02.
 Panayiotis Varotsos, Curriculum Vitae and Publication List,  19-02-2015 (in Greek). Retrieved on 07-08-2016.

Greek seismologists
21st-century Greek physicists
Academic staff of the National and Kapodistrian University of Athens
1947 births
Living people
20th-century Greek physicists
People from Patras